Tiberiu Claudiu Petriș (born 20 June 1994) is a Romanian professional footballer who plays as a midfielder for MSE Târgu Mureș.

References

External links
 
 

1994 births
Living people
Sportspeople from Târgu Mureș
Romanian footballers
Association football midfielders
Liga I players
Liga II players
ASA 2013 Târgu Mureș players
FC Brașov (1936) players
CS Gaz Metan Mediaș players
LPS HD Clinceni players
ASC Daco-Getica București players